In celebration of its twentieth anniversary, a special 20th anniversary team was named by Australia's National Basketball League in 1998.

 = active at the time the team was named

See also
 National Basketball League (Australia)
 NBL (Australia) 25th Anniversary Team

20th Anniversary Team